Australia has sent athletes to all editions of the modern Olympic Games.  Australia has competed in every Summer Olympic Games, as well as every Winter Olympics except 1924–32 and 1948. In 1908 and 1912 Australia competed with New Zealand under the name Australasia.

History

The Australian Olympic Committee was founded and recognised in 1895. Edwin Flack was the first athlete to represent Australia at the Olympics. He won gold in both the 800 metres and the 1500 metres, competed in the marathon and won a bronze medal in tennis doubles at the 1896 Summer Olympics in Athens, Greece. Australia's kit is green and gold.

Australia is the first country in history in the Southern Hemisphere to host the games.They hosted the Summer Olympic games twice: in 1956 in Melbourne and in 2000 in Sydney. Australia finished 3rd and 4th in the respective medal counts. The country is due to host the Summer Olympics a third time in 2032 in Brisbane. In the Summer Olympics since 2000, Australia has placed 4th, 4th, 6th, 8th*, 10th and 6th respectively. (*Australia initially finished in 10th position in 2012, but 8th position after the redistributed gold medal to Jared Tallent). Given Australia has a population of only around 23 million people (ranked 53rd in the world), this fact is frequently cited as noteworthy, and is ostensibly due to a strong sporting culture. Other observers have suggested this may also be a result of the generous funding the Australian Government has invested into elite sports development with the specific intention of improving performance at the Olympic games. Prior to Montreal, there was no government funding, however.

Many of Australia's gold medals have come in swimming, a sport which is popular in Australia, with swimmers from Dawn Fraser to Emma McKeon ranking among the sport's all-time greats.  Other sports where Australia has historically been strong include:
 field hockey, with the women's team winning three gold medals between 1988 and 2000 and the men's team winning in 2004;
 cycling, particularly track cycling;
 rowing;
 equestrian events and specifically the three-day team's eventing;
 and sailing.

Australia takes international sporting competition, particularly the Olympics, very seriously, and provides much government funding and coaching support to elite athletes, partly through the Australian Institute of Sport. Australia has been more modestly successful in the track events at the games, particularly in modern times. Historically, Betty Cuthbert is Australia's most successful track athlete with four gold medals (three in 1956 and one in 1964).

Australia did not win a medal at the Winter Olympics until 1994, but has moved higher on the medal tallies since then (ranking 13th at Vancouver 2010). This is a reflection on increased funding of Australia's Olympic Winter Games team.

Olympic bids and hosted Games

Hosted Games 
Australia has hosted the Olympic Games twice and will host again in 2032:

Unsuccessful bids 
Australia has unsuccessfully bid for the Games on three other occasions:

Overview of Olympic participation

Timeline of participation

Australia at the Summer Olympics

Australia at the Winter Olympics

Medals by summer sport

Medals by winter sport 

These totals do not include 11 medals recognised by the Australian Olympic Committee: 10 medals (3 gold, 4 silver and 3 bronze) won by Australians competing for the combined Australasia team in 1908 and 1912 (8 by individuals, 1 by an exclusively Australian team and 1 by a combined team) and 1 bronze medal won in tennis by Edwin Flack in 1896. The AOC therefore recognises Australia as having won 558 medals at the Summer Olympics (167 gold, 177 silver and 214 bronze).

Medals by individual 
According to official data of the International Olympic Committee. This is a list of people who have won three or more Olympic gold medals for Australia. Medals won in the 1906 Intercalated Games are not included. It includes top-three placings in 1896 and 1900, before medals were awarded for top-three placings.

 People in bold are still active competitors

Dale Begg-Smith and Torah Bright are the most successful Australian athletes at the Winter Olympics, with one gold medal and one silver each (Steven Bradbury, Alisa Camplin, and Lydia Lassila all won one gold and one bronze medal). Emma McKeon is the most prolific athlete at a single games, winning 7 medals (4 gold, 3 bronze) at the 2020 Olympics.

Summary by sport

Aquatics

Swimming

Australia first competed in swimming at the 1900 Games, with Freddie Lane competing in two events and winning gold medals in both. The sport would become a strength of the nation, which (as of the 2020 Games) has the second-most gold and second-most total medals behind the United States.

Athletics

Australia first competed in athletics at the inaugural 1896 Games, with 1 athlete (Edwin Flack) competing in 3 events and winning two of them.

Canoeing

Cycling

Football
Australia first qualified for Olympic football in the 1956 games in Melbourne as hosts.

Rowing

Sailing

Tennis

Australia first competed in tennis at the inaugural 1896 Games, with one player competing in men's singles and, as part of a mixed team, in men's doubles. Edwin Flack lost in the first round of the singles, but paired with George S. Robertson to earn bronze in the doubles. The mixed team medal is not credit to Australia. The only tennis gold medal won by Australia was by the Woodies in men's doubles in 1996; the pair also won Australia's only silver medal in the sport four years later.

See also

 List of flag bearers for Australia at the Olympics
 Australia at the Winter Olympics
 Australia at the Commonwealth Games
 Australia at the Universiade
 Australia at the World Championships in Athletics
 :Category:Olympic competitors for Australia

Notes

References

External links
 
 
 
 Australia NOC